Koudougou Airport  is a public use airport located near Koudougou, Sanguié, Burkina Faso.

See also
List of airports in Burkina Faso

References

External links 
 Airport record for Koudougou Airport at Landings.com

Airports in Burkina Faso
Sanguié Province